The Women's 100 metre butterfly S13 swimming event at the 2004 Summer Paralympics was competed on 19 September. It was won by Kirby Cote, representing .

Final round

19 Sept. 2004, evening session

References

W
2004 in women's swimming